State Road 526 was a short north–south highway connecting the Purdue University Airport with State Road 126 in West Lafayette.

Route description
State Road 526 ran along the approximate western boundary of the Purdue University campus. It was a child of, and intersected with, State Road 26. It began at the airport and ran north to State Street, the former SR 26. Continuing north, it was concurrent with McCormick Road; it passed Third Street, then veered to the northwest and terminated at State Road 126, which is also Cherry Lane. McCormick Road continues along the same line.

In conjunction with the 2013 bypass of Lafayette/West Lafayette carrying US 231, the SR 526 designation was removed.

Major intersections

References

External links

526
Transportation in Tippecanoe County, Indiana